Uncial 0177 (in the Gregory-Aland numbering), is a Greek-Coptic uncial manuscript of the New Testament, dated paleographically to the 10th-century.

Description 
The codex contains a small part of the Gospel of Luke 1:73-2:7 (Greek) and Luke 1:59-73 (Coptic), on one parchment leaf (36 cm by 27.5 cm). It is written in two columns per page, 36 lines per page, in uncial letters. The parchment is ivory coloured.

The nomina sacra are written in an abbreviated way.

The Greek text of this codex is a representative of the Western text-type. It contains many scribal peculiarities. Aland placed it in Category II.

Currently it is dated by the INTF to the 10th-century.

The codex currently is housed at the Papyrus Collection of the Austrian National Library (Pap. K. 2698) in Vienna.

See also 

 List of New Testament uncials
 Coptic versions of the Bible
 Textual criticism

References

Further reading 

 Walter Till, Papyrussammlung der Nationalbibliothek in Wien: Katalog der Koptischen Bibelstücke. Der Pergamente, ZNW 39 (1940), pp. 1–56.
 Stanley E. Porter, New Testament Greek Papyri and Parchments, Vienna 2008, pp. 117–123.

External links 

  – digitized manuscript
 Uncial 0177 at the Wieland Willker, "Textual Commentary"

Greek New Testament uncials
Greek-Coptic diglot manuscripts of the New Testament
10th-century biblical manuscripts
Biblical manuscripts of the Austrian National Library